The following Forbes list of Danish billionaires is based on an annual assessment of wealth and assets compiled and published by Forbes magazine in 2022.

2022 Danish billionaires list 
The list, as of 2022.

See also
 The World's Billionaires, annual Forbes list
 List of countries by the number of billionaires

Notes

References

Lists of people by wealth
Net worth
 
Economy of Denmark-related lists